The Joy Formidable is a Welsh alternative rock band, formed in 2007 in Mold, Flintshire, and currently based in London, England. The band consists of Rhiannon "Ritzy" Bryan (lead vocals, guitar), Rhydian Dafydd (bass, vocals) and Matthew James Thomas (drums, percussion).

History

2007–2009: Beginnings and A Balloon Called Moaning
Childhood friends and then couple Ritzy Bryan and bassist Rhydian Dafydd originally played together as part of Manchester band Tricky Nixon, which later reformed into Sidecar Kisses. After Sidecar Kisses split up in 2007, they regrouped, returning to their Welsh home town of Mold, and formed the Joy Formidable with Justin Stahley on drums. In July 2008, they released their first official single, "Austere". It was followed by a Christmas single, "My Beerdrunk Soul Is Sadder than a Hundred Dead Christmas Trees", issued as a 2008 digital download, and the "Cradle" double 7" in 2009. The band's debut EP A Balloon Called Moaning was released exclusively in Japan on 17 December 2008, followed by a UK release in March 2009.

In 2009, Stahley was replaced with Matthew James Thomas. That April, they teamed with a new label started by Passion Pit's Ayad Al Adhamy, Black Bell Records, to release A Balloon Called Moaning in the U.S, earning favourable reviews from NME, The Guardian, The Times, Spin and Pitchfork.

2010–2011: The Big Roar
In 2010, the band signed to Canvasback Records, a subsidiary of Atlantic, and began work on their debut album, The Big Roar, which was recorded in London. Dafydd said that "(it) covers a lot of emotional range. It's captured the battle between the eternal optimist and the manic depressive". The album was produced by the Joy Formidable with help from engineer Neak Menter. The band traveled to Los Angeles to mix it with producer Rich Costey, who had worked with bands such as Mew, Muse, Foo Fighters and Glasvegas.

The Big Roar was released on 24 January 2011 and included early singles "Austere", "Cradle" and "Whirring" as well as two further singles, "I Don't Want to See You Like This" and "A Heavy Abacus" ("Whirring" was later sampled by the Lonely Island on "YOLO"). In November 2011, their song "Endtapes" was featured on The Twilight Saga: Breaking Dawn film soundtrack.

2012–2014: Wolf's Law and Aruthrol
On 23 August 2012, the song "Wolf's Law", was released as a free download from their then-upcoming second studio album of the same title. Two official singles, "This Ladder Is Ours" and "Cholla", were released in late 2012, the former peaking at no. 24 on the US Alternative Songs chart. The band's second studio album, Wolf's Law, was officially released on 21 January 2013 in the UK, and the following day in the U.S.

Most of the writing for Wolf's Law was done on the road during the 12-month tour in support of their previous record, The Big Roar. Commenting on the writing process for the album, Bryan explained that the songs for the album were approached with vocals and one accompaniment (either guitar or piano) before being built upon, stating, "It's all about the lyrics, the voice and the melody". The vocals and guitars were recorded in January 2012 in Maine, while drums and additional orchestral and choir pieces for the record were scored and recorded by the band in February 2012 in London. Mixing duties for the record were handled by Andy Wallace while the records production was completed by the band. The album title referred to Wolff's law, a scientific theory by Julius Wolff which posits that bones may become stronger in response to stress as a form of adaptation. According to Bryan, this related to one of the major themes of the album, which is "relationships on the mend and feeling reinvigorated"; she continued that the album felt like the band reconnecting with themselves emotionally and spiritually.

For Record Store Day on 20 April 2013, the Joy Formidable released a limited-edition 12" single of "A Minute's Silence", an outtake from Wolf's Law, backed by a live cover of Bruce Springsteen's "Badlands". "Silent Treatment" was later released as the album's third and final single in July 2013. In July 2014, the band began releasing monthly vinyl singles, titled Aruthrol, consisting of songs sung in their native Welsh language released as a double A-side with a contribution by another artist. Three singles, "Yn Rhydiau'r Afon", "Tynnu Sylw" and "Y Garreg Ateb", were released exclusively on 7" vinyl in collaboration with Colorama, White Noise Sound and Bloom & Heavy Petting Zoo.

2015–2017: Hitch
On 27 January 2016, the band announced on their Facebook page that their third studio album, Hitch, was due for release on 25 March 2016. The band also uploaded a new song titled "The Last Thing on My Mind", accompanied by a self-produced montage music video consisting of clips of scantily clad or nude men, which Bryan explained to be in response to the over-sexualisation of women in modern media, stating "We don't condone objectification in general, the point here is, when the media representation is imbalanced, if we're mostly seeing women sexualised or objectified, from a male perspective or otherwise, it's limited, it's damaging and frankly; it's boring too".

2018–2020: AAARTH
On 26 June 2018, the band announced that their fourth studio album, AAARTH, was due for release on 28 September 2018. The band also joined Foo Fighters for a short tour.

2021–present: Into the Blue
On 6 May 2021, the band announced that their fifth studio album, Into the Blue, was due for release on 20 August 2021. The single Into the Blue was written in Wales but recorded in Utah, where they are residing. It was released in March 2021.
On 4 June 2022, the band began their world tour, starting in their home town of Mold, Wales, UK at the Rhosesmor Village Hall, Mold, Wales, before setting off to the US and back to many cities in Europe.

Discography

The Big Roar (2011)
Wolf's Law (2013)
Hitch (2016)
AAARTH (2018)
Into the Blue (2021)

References

External links

Official website
Interview with What's On Wales
The Joy Formidable biography from BBC Wales
The Joy Formidable's Reading and Leeds appearance on BBC

Musical groups established in 2007
Welsh-language bands
British musical trios
Welsh alternative rock groups
Welsh indie rock groups
2007 establishments in Wales